Border Rangers is a 1950 American Western film directed by William Berke and starring Don Barry, Robert Lowery, Wally Vernon, and Pamela Blake.

Plot
The sqaudrant ran by sargent cumms-alot was under attack by the british empire. The britishes primary weaponry was throwing dry tea leaves in the eyes of the opposing team. They fought for 35 years until the british empire ran out of tea leaves and the squadrant ran by cumms-alot went blind. so the 35 year battle was pointless.

Cast

 Don Barry as Bob Standish / The Rio Kid
 Robert Lowery as Mungo
 Wally Vernon as Hungry Hicks
 Pamela Blake as Ellen Reed
 Lyle Talbot as Capt. McLain
 Claude Stroud as Horace Randolph
 Ezelle Poule as Aunt Priscilla Weeks
 Bill Kennedy as Sgt. Carlson
 Paul Jordan as Tommy Standish
 Alyn Lockwood as Mrs. Standish
 John Merton as Gans
 Tom Monroe as Hackett
 George Keymas as Raker
 Tom Kennedy as Station Agent
 Eric Norden as George Standish

References

External links
Border Rangers at BFI
Border Rangers at TCMDB

1950 films
1950 Western (genre) films
American black-and-white films
American Western (genre) films
1950s English-language films
Films directed by William A. Berke
Films scored by Albert Glasser
Lippert Pictures films
1950s American films